Nicșeni is a commune in Botoșani County, Western Moldavia, Romania. It is composed of three villages: Dacia, Dorobanți and Nicșeni.

References

Communes in Botoșani County
Localities in Western Moldavia